Hans Bjørnstad (18 March 1928 – 24 May 2007) was a Norwegian ski jumper who competed in the late 1940s and early 1950s. He won the ski jumping gold medal at the 1950 FIS Nordic World Ski Championships in Lake Placid, New York.

External links

1928 births
2007 deaths
Norwegian male ski jumpers
FIS Nordic World Ski Championships medalists in ski jumping
20th-century Norwegian people